Jon Inge Kjørum (born 23 May 1965) is a Norwegian former ski jumper.

Career
His best-known success was at the 1988 Winter Olympics, where he earned a bronze medal in the team large hill event. Kjørum also won a silver medal in the team large hill at the 1989 FIS Nordic World Ski Championships in Lahti.

World Cup

Standings

Wins

External links
 
 

1965 births
Living people
Norwegian male ski jumpers
Olympic ski jumpers of Norway
Olympic bronze medalists for Norway
Ski jumpers at the 1988 Winter Olympics
Olympic medalists in ski jumping
FIS Nordic World Ski Championships medalists in ski jumping
Medalists at the 1988 Winter Olympics
Sportspeople from Hamar